The Edward Drake Building, formerly the CBC Building, was the name of a modernist office building in Ottawa, Ontario, Canada designed by CBC's chief architect David Gordon McKinstry and constructed between 1961 and 1964.

It originally served as the headquarters of the Canadian Broadcasting Corporation, but significant CBC budget cutbacks in the 1990s led to the relocation of the head office staff  in 1997. The building was later occupied by the Communications Security Establishment (CSE) and was renamed in honour of the first director of its predecessor organisation, the Communications Branch of the National Research Council.

The building occupies a large site bordered by Riverside Drive, Heron Road and Bronson Avenue.  For more than four decades, it has been a landmark in south Ottawa as it is set apart from any other buildings, and it was particularly known for the large CBC/Radio Canada logo on one wing of the building (since removed). It has been designated as a "classified federal heritage building," which means that it is a federal government building that has been assigned the highest level of heritage protection.

On February 26, 2015, CSE's new facility in Ottawa's east end was officially named the Edward Drake Building.

See also

 Victoria Building (Ottawa) - CBC Head Office 1938-1964
 CBC Ottawa Broadcast Centre - CBC Head Office since 2004

References

External links
Ottawa Regional Society of Architects - Edward Drake Building
Historic Places of Canada - Edward Drake Building
Treasury Board of Canada Inventory - Edward Drake Building

Federal government buildings in Ottawa
Modernist architecture in Canada
Canadian Broadcasting Corporation buildings
Communications Security Establishment buildings and structures
Government buildings completed in 1964
Intelligence agency headquarters
Office buildings in Canada
Classified Federal Heritage Building
1964 establishments in Ontario